Mekitsa (plural mekitsi) is a traditional Bulgarian dish made of kneaded dough made with yogurt that is deep fried. It is also found in North Macedonia and Serbia. They are made with flour, eggs, yogurt, a leavening agent, water, salt, and oil. They are similar to Hungarian lángos and British Yorkshire pudding. Mekitsa is conventionally a breakfast dish.

After the dough rises, it is torn into small balls, spread into flat rounds and fried in oil. In some recipes, yeast, baking soda, milk or yogurt might be used. A recipe from Silistra involves yogurt and bread soda, one from a village near Stara Zagora uses yeast and yogurt, and a recipe from Aytos suggests yeast and milk. One of the oldest known recipes contains only yeast, flour, salt and sugar and it uses water as the sole wet ingredient. It is recommended that the shaping of mekitsi before their frying be done with wet or oiled hand hands, using most commonly vegetable oil.

When served, mekitsa is often powdered with icing sugar or garnished with jam, honey or sirene (white cheese). It can also be eaten with yogurt.

In North Macedonia people prepare the dish the week after a newborn is born. That is like a celebration for the newborn baby, tradition says that it should be in the house where the baby will live, but nowadays this celebration mostly happens in restaurants.

The dish was invented in the 5th century in modern-day Bulgaria, and is still relevant and popular in the Bulgarian, Macedonian, and Serbian regions and is a common cultural dish. The name is derived from the Slavic root mek ("soft"), referring to the dish's texture. –itsa is a Slavic feminine suffix. It tastes like and also has the same ingredients as the naan flatbread of the Indian subcontinent but the only difference is  that naan is baked in a traditional clay oven, called tandoor unlike mekista.

See also
 List of doughnut varieties
 List of fried dough foods
 Shelpek

References

Bulgarian pastries
Deep fried foods
Doughnuts
Flatbreads